The Liverpool Scotland by-election of 1 April 1971 was held after Labour Member of Parliament (MP) Walter Alldritt resigned from the House of Commons. The seat was retained by Labour.

Results

References

Liverpool Scotland by-election
Liverpool Scotland by-election
Liverpool Scotland by-election
1970s in Liverpool
Scotland, 1971